Kotak is a surname. Notable persons with that name include:

 İsmet Kotak (1939-2011), Turkish Cypriot politician
 Janak Kotak, Indian politician
 Karishma Kotak (born 1982), Indian model and actor
 Marni Kotak (born 1974), American artist
 Shitanshu Kotak (born 1972), Indian cricketer
 Uday Kotak (born 1959), Indian  businessman
 Vaju Kotak (born 1915), Indian writer